Kaninë Castle is a castle in the village Kaninë near Vlorë, in southwestern Albania.

History

The castle was built on the site of an ancient settlement, one of the oldest in the Vlora region. The castle is believed to have been erected in the 3rd century B.C. In the 4th century B.C. the castle was transformed into a fortress town. In the 6th century A.D. the castle was reconstructed by Justinian I. The castle was the center of the Principality of Valona in the 14th century.

The settlement covers an area of 3.6 hectares.

References

Sources

Buildings and structures completed in the 3rd century
Buildings and structures completed in the 6th century
Castles in Albania
Buildings of Justinian I
Buildings and structures in Vlorë
6th-century fortifications